Clerus is a genus of beetles in the subfamily Clerinae.

Species 
Clerus africanus - Clerus dealbatus - Clerus formosanus - Clerus guishanensis - Clerus intermedius - Clerus klapperichi - Clerus mutillaeformis - Clerus mutillarius - Clerus mutillaroides - Clerus sinae - Clerus thanasimoides

References 

 
 

Cleridae genera
Clerinae